Siryet is a 2007 Ethiopian crime thriller film directed and produced by Yidnekachew Shumete, being the first produced film by Yidnekachew. Written by Dereje Fikiru, the film stars with Girum Ermias, Bertukan Befikadu, Enkusilassie Workagegnehu, Alebachew Mekonnen, Thomas Tora, Felek Kassa, Kassahun Fisseha and  Solomon Tashe, and revolves around a disfigured serial killer who want to track the family of six men identified with him.

Plot
Gaga, a severely disfigured man, seeks Akafle (or Akakiye) for unknown reason. Akafle's son Naty, discovers the arrival of the man and reported to his oldest brother Mesfin, who relentlessly search for Gaga's identity who visited their house at night.

Mesfin, later accompanied by his brother, pursue Gaga by concealing themselves from being seen. Gaga lumbers to random houses and disappeared from the brothers sight; while looking him, they heard woman screaming and they headed to house. Gaga already enter the woman house, shows a piece of paper which reads "Have you forgotten me?" and brutally dismembers her body and escaped through the roof. Mesfin and Naty arrived the scene and found severed arms and limbs of the woman strained by blood.

In the second sequence, Mesfin opened a company working as managing director with the daughter of owner of the company, Melawit. Melawit, graduated from a college, works as electrician and began affairs with Mesfin. Melawit prepared a dinner party on the occasion of her graduation in which Mesfin and his brother invited in the party, though their father forbid them to go. Gaga arrived the party cautiously. While dancing, Sharew's phone rings and go out to in front of window to answer the phone, where Gaga appeared in the back of him. Gaga stabbed Sharew to death and cut his tongue before showing "Have you forgotten me?" paper sign, and throw him from floor which impaled his body by steel in a parked car. The killing happened as Mesfin and Melawit were talking each other in another room.

Party-goer stunned by the killing and the police arrived the scene. Meanwhile, Ato Aklilu knows the phone number Sharew calling on. Melawit and Mesfin cheerfully enjoy their romantic period through going vacations. In order to have access, Gaga calls for Melawit and she gives to Mesfin and pointed out his location. Mesfin and Sancho arrived to Gaga's house to inspect the situation; Sancho feels dread after seeing Gaga and flee out of control. While investing Sharew's house, police found a photograph showing six intimate friends, who have turned to enemies.

Mesfin's father learn where the brothers went last night. He asked whether they are in the sight of his enemies and warned Mesfin not to meet Melawit. However, Mesfin insisted to do so. Melawit drives to unknown place and calls Mesfin and Gaga picked the phone and listens what she saying, including her information whereabouts. He then headed to her. While Melawit awaiting for Mesfin, her father, who learned Mesfin is his enemy son, tells her not to approach him through call. Gaga arrived the scene and searches for her as she hides inside small hallow and calls her father to rescue her before successfully escapes by car. Shortly after arrival, Ato Aklilu beaten to unconscious and kidnapped by Gaga. The police arrived the scene find only his cell phone.

Mesfin heads to Gaga's house and watches him loading Volkswagen van and then  quickly returned to house to call Melawit. When he reaches to Aklilu's house, police arrested him for investigation. Meanwhile, Gaga deceives the police and kidnaps Melawit. While arrived at Gaga's house, police found Ato Akafle, Mesfin's father, dead body hanging on the roof. Detective Menagesha tells Mesfin that his father found dead. At this point, Mesfin decides to revenge Gaga for his lose of his fiancé and his father.

Detective Menagesha brings one of his six friends who are already in prison, who has information about Gaga and Akafle, Aklilu and the two murdered. In flashback, the person narrates how Gaga or Shewangzaw and Akafle are attacked, his lost to the eye, and how Akafle managed to escape from his enemies.

Mesfin fortunately comes across the old van which Gaga loaded abroad taxi. He asked the taxi driver where he go and the driver responded they are going to old bullet store. At store, Gaga tied Ato Aklilu's hands and legs with a chair and gagged his mouth with handkerchief.  Then, Gaga brings Melawit to the store, lays her on a bench and ties. After that, he brings large flat wood filled with sharpened metal bars, hangs it on the cross bars of the roof and forces.

Ato Aklilu managed to untie the rope by glowing with fire. Meanwhile, Mesfin arrived and managed to save Melawit by attacking Gaga who is killed by police officers. At the end, Melawit and Mesfin are seen lying near a stream; Mesfin shows a photograph of six people before the picture swiped by the wind and floats to the stream.

Casts
 Girum Ermias
 Bertukan Befikadu
 Enkusilassie Workagegnehu
 Alebachew Mekonnen
 Solomon Tashe
 Thomas Tora
 Felek Kassa
 Kassahun Fisseha

References

External links
 Siryet at Yageru

2007 films
Ethiopian thriller films
2007 thriller films
Serial killer films